Volva is a genus of sea snails, specifically cowry allies or ovulids, marine gastropod molluscs in the family Ovulidae.

Species
Species within the genus Volva include:
Volva cumulata Iredale, 1931
Volva habei Oyama, 1961
Volva kilburni Cate, 1975
Volva striata (Lamarck, 1810)
Volva volva (Linnaeus, 1758)

Synonyms
Volva acicularis (Lamarck, 1811): synonym of Cymbovula acicularis (Lamarck, 1811)
Volva adamsi Dunker, 1877: synonym of Phenacovolva rosea (A. Adams, 1854)
Volva birostris (Linnaeus, 1767): synonym of Phenacovolva birostris (Linnaeus, 1767)
Volva brevirostris (Schumacher, 1817): synonym of Phenacovolva brevirostris (Schumacher, 1817)
Volva brunneiterma Cate, 1969: synonym of Pellasimnia brunneiterma (Cate, 1969)
Volva carpenteri Dunker, 1877: synonym of Phenacovolva rosea (A. Adams, 1854)
Volva haynesi (Sowerby, 1889): synonym of Pellasimnia angasi (Reeve, 1865)
Volva lemurica Schilder, 1941: synonym of Volva volva (Linnaeus, 1758)
Volva longirostrata (Sowerby, 1828): synonym for Phenacovolva recurva (Sowerby in A. Adams & Reeve, 1848)
Volva rosea A. Adams, 1854: synonym of Phenacovolva rosea (A. Adams, 1854)
Volva sowerbyana Allan, 1956: synonym of Phenacovolva rosea (A. Adams, 1854)

References

Further reading 
 
 Powell A. W. B., New Zealand Mollusca, William Collins Publishers Ltd, Auckland, New Zealand 1979 

Ovulidae
Taxa named by Peter Friedrich Röding